Barjora Assembly constituency is an assembly constituency in Bankura district in the Indian state of West Bengal.

Overview
As per orders of the Delimitation Commission, No. 253 Barjora Assembly constituency is composed of the following: Barjora community development block; and Bhaktabandh, Gangajalghati, Gobindadham, Kapista, Nityanandapur and Piraboni gram panchayats of Gangajalghati community development block.

Barjora Assembly constituency is part of No. 37 Bishnupur (Lok Sabha constituency).

Members of Vidhan Sabha

Election results

2021

2016

2011

1977-2006
In the 2006, 2001 and 1996 state assembly elections, Susmita Biswas of CPI(M) won the Barjora seat defeating Shampa Daripa of Trinamool Congress, Sudhansu Sekhar Tewari of Trinamool Congress and Tapasi Banerjee of Congress respectively. Contests in most years were multi cornered but only winners and runners are being mentioned. Jayasri Mitra of CPI(M) defeated Sabyasachi Roy of Congress in 1991 and Sudhansu Sekhar Tewari of Congress in 1987. Lalbihari Bhattacharya of CPI(M) defeated Sudhansu Sekhar Tewari of Congress in 1982. Aswini Kumar Raj of CPI(M) defeated Sudhansu Sekhar Tewari of Congress in 1977.

1952-1972
Sudhansu Sekhar Tewary of Congress won in 1972. Aswini Kumar Raj of CPI(M) won in 1971 and 1969. A.Chatterjee of Congress won in 1967. Pramatha Ghosh of CPI won in 1962. The Barjora seat was not there in 1957. Prafulla Chandra Roy of Congress won the Barjora seat in independent India's first election in 1952.

References

Assembly constituencies of West Bengal
Politics of Bankura district